Protocardia is an extinct genus of saltwater clams, marine bivalve mollusks in the subfamoly Protocardiinae of the family Cardiidae, the cockles. 

The internal anatomy of individuals in this genus is sometimes preserved in phosphate.

References 

Prehistoric bivalve genera